This is a list of Kannada films that are scheduled to release or have been released in 2022.

Box office collection
The highest-grossing Sandalwood films released in 2022, by worldwide box office gross revenue, are as follows:

January – March

April – June

July – September

October – December

Notes

References

External links 
 Kannada Upcoming Releases

2022 in Indian cinema
Lists of 2022 films by country or language
2022